In Greek mythology, Podalirius or Podaleirius or Podaleirios was a son of Asclepius.

Description 
In the account of Dares the Phrygian, Podalirius was illustrated as ". . .sturdy, strong, haughty, and moody."

Mythology

Trojan war 
With Machaon, his brother, he led thirty ships from Tricca, Thessaly in the Trojan War on the side of the Greeks. Like Machaon, he was a legendary healer. He healed Philoctetes, holder of the bow and arrows of Heracles required to end the war. He was one of those who entered the Trojan Horse. Alongside Amphilochus, Calchas, Leonteus and Polypoetes he traveled to Colophon, where Calchas died.

Aftermath 
 
Unlike his brother, Podalirius survived the war, and subsequently settled in Caria. Accounts vary as to how he ended up there. According to one version, he returned to Argos after the war but later went on to consult the Delphian oracle about a preferable place for himself to live, and was instructed to stay at a place where he would suffer no harm should the sky fall; thus he chose the Carian peninsula which was surrounded by mountains. Others relate that on the way back from Troy Podalirius' ship was blown off course so he landed in Syrnus, Caria, where he settled. In yet another version, he got shipwrecked near the Carian coast but was rescued by a shepherd named Bybassus, the eponym-to-be of a city in Caria. Podalirus could be the founder of Syrnus, which he became after the following series of events. Podalirius arrived at the court of the Carian king Damaethus and healed the king's daughter Syrna, who had fallen off a roof. In reward, Damaethus gave him Syrna in marriage and handed the power over the peninsula over to him. Podalirus founded two cities, one of which he named Syrnus after his wife and the other Bybassus after the shepherd to whom he owed his life.

According to Strabo, a heroön of Podalirius, and another of Calchas, were located in Daunia, Italy, on a hill known as Drium. By the hero-shrine of Podalirius there flowed a stream believed to cure animals of any diseases. Lycophron writes that Podalirius was buried in Italy near the cenotaph of Calchas, but John Tzetzes accuses him of providing false information and defends the versions cited above.

See also 
 4086 Podalirius, a Jovian asteroid
 Podalyria, a plant genus in Fabaceae, was named for Podalirius.
 Iphiclides podalirius, the scarce swallowtail butterfly.

Notes

References 

 Apollodorus, The Library with an English Translation by Sir James George Frazer, F.B.A., F.R.S. in 2 Volumes, Cambridge, MA, Harvard University Press; London, William Heinemann Ltd. 1921. ISBN 0-674-99135-4. Online version at the Perseus Digital Library. Greek text available from the same website.
 Dares Phrygius, from The Trojan War. The Chronicles of Dictys of Crete and Dares the Phrygian translated by Richard McIlwaine Frazer, Jr. (1931-). Indiana University Press. 1966. Online version at theio.com
 Homer, The Iliad with an English Translation by A.T. Murray, Ph.D. in two volumes. Cambridge, MA., Harvard University Press; London, William Heinemann, Ltd. 1924. . Online version at the Perseus Digital Library.
 Homer, Homeri Opera in five volumes. Oxford, Oxford University Press. 1920. . Greek text available at the Perseus Digital Library.
 Lycophron, The Alexandra  translated by Alexander William Mair. Loeb Classical Library Volume 129. London: William Heinemann, 1921. Online version at the Topos Text Project.
 Lycophron, Alexandra translated by A.W. Mair. London: William Heinemann; New York: G.P. Putnam's Sons. 1921. Greek text available at the Perseus Digital Library.
 Quintus Smyrnaeus, The Fall of Troy translated by Way. A. S. Loeb Classical Library Volume 19. London: William Heinemann, 1913. Online version at theio.com
 Quintus Smyrnaeus, The Fall of Troy. Arthur S. Way. London: William Heinemann; New York: G.P. Putnam's Sons. 1913. Greek text available at the Perseus Digital Library.
 Stephanus of Byzantium, Stephani Byzantii Ethnicorum quae supersunt, edited by August Meineike (1790-1870), published 1849. A few entries from this important ancient handbook of place names have been translated by Brady Kiesling. Online version at the Topos Text Project.
 Strabo, The Geography of Strabo. Edition by H.L. Jones. Cambridge, Mass.: Harvard University Press; London: William Heinemann, Ltd. 1924. Online version at the Perseus Digital Library.
 Strabo, Geographica edited by A. Meineke. Leipzig: Teubner. 1877. Greek text available at the Perseus Digital Library.

External links 
 

Children of Asclepius
Achaean Leaders
Thessalians in the Trojan War
Greek mythological heroes
Mythological Greek physicians